Engaeus granulatus, the central north burrowing crayfish, is a species of crayfish in the family Parastacidae. It is endemic to Australia.

References

Sources
Doran, N. and Horwitz, P. 2010. Engaeus granulatus. IUCN Red List of Threatened Species 2010. Retrieved 5 February 2017.

Parastacidae
Critically endangered fauna of Australia
Freshwater crustaceans of Australia
Taxonomy articles created by Polbot
Crustaceans described in 1990